José Cordero may refer to:

 José F. Cordero, Puerto Rican doctor
 José Luis Cordero (footballer) (born 1987), Costa Rican footballer
 José Luis Cordero (actor) (born 1948), Mexican actor, singer and director
 Lince Dorado (born José Cordero 1987), Puerto Rican professional wrestler

See also 
 José García Cordero (born 1951), Dominican artist in Paris
 José Villegas Cordero (1844–1921), Spanish painter
 Joseph Cordero (1718–1797), Spanish clockmaker 
 José Luis Cordeiro Futurist